Dolly West's Kitchen is a dark Irish and deeply Chekhovian play written by playwright Frank McGuinness. Dolly West's Kitchen was first staged in the Abbey Theatre, Dublin in 1999. Set during the Second World War in the town of Buncrana, County Donegal, the play tells the story of the West family and how they deal with the war in Europe and the war that ensues in their very own kitchen.

Plot
The play is set in 1943 during the Second World War in the small town of Buncrana, on the border with Derry, Northern Ireland during the Emergency. Dolly West is home after fleeing Italy before the war. She runs the household for her elderly mother Rima, her elder sister Esther and her younger brother Justin. Also living in the house is Esther's husband Ned and the housemaid Anna. Justin, a junior Officer in the Irish army is deeply nationalistic and in favour of Irish neutrality.

But questions are asked of the neutrality of both Ireland and the house, when three foreigners are invited across the border into the house by Rima. The first is Alec, an English officer, and former lover of Dolly's. The other two are American soldiers, Marco and Jamie. Soon clashes over issues of loyalty, jealousy, sexual identity and love creep into Dolly West's Kitchen.

Characters
Dolly West - not a stereotypical 1940's Irish girl, she is educated, traveled and not married. She has returned home from Florence due to the war.

Esther Horgan - Dolly's unhappily married sister, who is like her father.

Justin West - Dolly's volatile nationalistic Irish officer brother.

Rima West - The mother of the house, Rima is a very unconventional and wise woman.

Ned Horgan - Esther's husband

Marco Delavicario - A flamboyantly homosexual American soldier stationed in Derry.

Jamie O'Brien - Marco's Irish-American cousin who is also an American soldier.

Alec Redding - Dolly's former lover from college, and now British soldier stationed in Derry.

Anna Owens - The young housemaid for the West family.

Original production
The premiere of Dolly West's Kitchen, directed by Patrick Mason, took place on 6 October 1999 in the Abbey Theatre, Dublin. The original cast were:

Dolly West - Donna Dent

Esther Horgan - Catherine Byrne

Justin West - Michael Colgan (actor)

Rima West - Pauline Flanagan

Ned Horgan - Simon O'Gorman

Marco Delavicario - Perry Laylon Ojeda Perry ojeda

Jamie O'Brien - Harry Carnahan

Alec Redding - Anthony Calf

Anna Owens - Lucianne McEvoy

Awards
2001 Olivier Awards - Nomination - Best New Play

2001 Olivier Awards - Winner (Pauline Flanagan) - Best Supporting Actress

References
Irish Playography Website
Chicago Sun-Times Review
Chicago Tribune Review
Olivier Awards Website

1999 plays
Fiction set in 1943
Buncrana
Plays by Frank McGuinness
Plays set in Ireland